Pullazhi/Pullazhy  is a suburban area of Thrissur City in Kerala state, south India. It is almost 6 km away from Swaraj Round. Pullazhy is surrounded by paddy fields called "Kolpadavu", supervised and controlled by Pullazhi Kolpadavu Sahakarana Sangham. Many of the native families have an agrarian background. The village also contains a library called "Yuvajana Sangham Vayanasala".  
                
An Accountant General's Quarters is situated in this village. The head office of the Thrissur Circle of the Archaeological Survey of India is inside the Green Valley KSHB colony. Kerala Lakshmi Mill in Pullazhy has a 42,944 spindle capacity, which produces carded polyester-cotton yarn. The mill is owned by National Textile Corporation(NTC). Pullazhi is Ward 47 of Thrissur Municipal Corporation. The village has a Working Women's Hostel run by the Kerala State Housing Board.

Landmarks
 Mannuthrikkovil Mahavishnu Temple
 Sree Maheswara Ttemple 
 Ayyappa Temple, Kolpara
 Aikkattu Dharmasastha Temple 
 Sree Muruga Temple, Vadakkumuri
 Kerala Lakshmi Mills
 St. Joseph Old Age Home
 St. Christina's Home
 Little Flower School
 Public Library (Yuvajana Sangham Vayanasala)
 AGs Quarters
 Office of the Superintending Archaeologist, Archaeological Survey of India, Thrissur Circle
 Pakal Veedu
 Working Women Hostel (KSHB)
 Navajyothi College of Teacher Education

Places of worship
 Mannuthrukkovil MahaVishnu Temple
 St. Joseph Church
 Sree Narayana Maheshwara Temple
 Sree Ayyappa Swami Temple
 St. Sebastian Chapel

Corporation councillors
Madathil Ramankutty (INC) 2000-2005
P.V. Sarojini (INC) 2005-2010
K. Ramanathan (INC) 2010-2015
Rajani Viju (CPI(M)) 2015-2020
K. Ramanathan (INC) 2020-

See also
 Thrissur
 Thrissur District

References

Suburbs of Thrissur city